is a railway station located in the city of Hashima, Gifu Prefecture,  Japan, operated by the private railway operator Meitetsu.

Lines

Station layout
Takehana Station has one ground-level side platform serving a single bi-directional track. The station is unattended.

Adjacent stations

History
Takehana Station opened on June 25, 1921. It reverted to its original name on January 1, 1951.

Surrounding area
Hakken Shrine
Takehana Elementary School
Hashima City Hospital

See also
 List of Railway Stations in Japan

External links

References

Railway stations in Japan opened in 1921
Stations of Nagoya Railroad
Railway stations in Gifu Prefecture
Hashima, Gifu